Willem Abraham Wythoff, born Wijthoff, (6 October 1865 – 21 May 1939) was a Dutch mathematician.

Biography
Wythoff was born in Amsterdam to Anna C. F. Kerkhoven and Abraham Willem Wijthoff, who worked in a sugar refinery. He studied at the University of Amsterdam, and earned his Ph.D. in 1898 under the supervision of Diederik Korteweg.

Contributions
Wythoff is known in combinatorial game theory and number theory for his study of Wythoff's game, whose solution involves the Fibonacci numbers. The Wythoff array, a two-dimensional array of numbers related to this game and to the Fibonacci sequence, is also named after him.

In geometry, Wythoff is known for the Wythoff construction of uniform tilings and uniform polyhedra and for the Wythoff symbol used as a notation for these geometric objects.

Selected publications
.
.

References

External links

1865 births
1939 deaths
19th-century Dutch mathematicians
Combinatorial game theorists
University of Amsterdam alumni
Scientists from Amsterdam
20th-century Dutch mathematicians